T-cell leukemia homeobox protein 2 is a protein that in humans is encoded by the TLX2 gene.

Interactions 

TLX2 has been shown to interact with YWHAH.

References

Further reading